Mahindra Racing is a motor racing team based in Banbury, United Kingdom, competing with an Indian racing licence. The team is currently competing in the electric FIA Formula E Championship since the inaugural season in 2014. The team formerly competed in Grand Prix motorcycle racing, fielding a team in the junior 125cc category (later renamed Moto3) between 2011 and 2015. Mahindra later refocused on being a bike and engine supplier, until ultimately pulling out of the sport in 2017.

FIA Formula E Championship (2014–present)

Overview 

Mahindra Racing competes in the FIA Formula E Championship. They entered the Championship in the inaugural 2014-2015 season as one of the ten founding teams.

From the second season of Formula E (2015-2016), the team developed its own electric powertrain, the M2Electro, to power their quartet of electric racing cars. The M2Electro impressed out of the box, with Nick Heidfeld scoring the team's first podium in the opening round in Beijing. Bruno Senna had a second place podium finish in the first of the two season finale races in London. The M2Electro also impressed with its efficiency and reliability, contributing to seven double points finishes throughout the season.

For Season Three of Formula E (2016-2017), rookie Felix Rosenqvist joined as teammate to Nick Heidfeld. Mahindra Racing developed the new M3Electro car, which proved to be a competitive package, powering the team to its maiden win at the hands of Rosenqvist at the 2017 Berlin ePrix. The team also scored nine further podiums, three pole positions and two fastest lap awards. These results were underscored by Mahindra Racing's third place in the Teams’ Championship standings.

Drivers Felix Rosenqvist and Nick Heidfeld remained with Mahindra for fourth season of Formula E (2017-2018), piloting the M4Electro to two further victories, in Hong Kong and Marrakesh, and three pole positions. After a strong and encouraging start to the season, the team finished fourth overall in the team's championship, with Rosenqvist in the driver's title hunt for much of the season.

For Season Five of Formula E (2018–19), Felix Rosenqvist left the team to join the Chip Ganassi Racing team in IndyCar series and was replaced by former Dragon Racing driver Jérôme d'Ambrosio. Nick Heidfeld stepped down from his race seat to become a special advisor and official reserve driver for the squad and was replaced by former Manor and Sauber Formula 1 driver and DTM champion Pascal Wehrlein. Racing the M5Electro, the Mahindra drivers secured one win, two podiums, two fastest laps, a pole position and seven Super Pole appearances between them, finishing the Championship in sixth place.

Wehrlein and D'Ambrosio were announced as continuing with the team for Season 6 (2019/20) at a launch event in Germany in October 2019. On 24 June 2020 the team announced that Alex Lynn would replace Wehrlein for the remainder of the 2019/20 Season. The team finished the 2019–20 season ranking ninth on the constructors standings. D'Ambrosio would later announce his retirement from professional racing after the season to take on a team principal role at Venturi Racing.

2020–21 season
On 29 October 2020, Mahindra revealed the new M7Electro car, Alexander Sims and Alex Lynn were confirmed as the driver lineup for the 2020–21 Formula E season.

2021–22 season
Lynn was replaced by Oliver Rowland for the 2021–22 Formula E season.

2022–23 season
Sims was announced to not return to the team for the 2022–23 season; he was replaced by Lucas di Grassi. Team principal Dilbagh Gill left the team in September 2022, entering a period of gardening leave; he was replaced by Frédéric Bertrand.

Mahindra Racing Team and Drivers

FIM MotoGP Series

As a team
In 2011, Mahindra Racing made its motor racing debut in the 125cc class of the MotoGP championship, which was then in its last year. The team performed well in their inaugural season, capped off by Danny Webb securing Team Mahindra's first-ever pole position in the last race, at the Circuit Ricardo Tormo in Valencia, Spain.

In 2012, Mahindra Racing participated in the newly formed Moto3 (250cc four-stroke) class which replaced the 125cc class. On 5 November 2011, Anand Mahindra then Vice Chairman & Managing Director of Mahindra & Mahindra, unveiled the MGP3O, the team's Moto3 Motorcycle. The MGP3O, liveried in red and white, featured a tubular steel frame and an aluminium swing arm. It weighed 83 kg and had a Mahindra-homologated 250cc, single-cylinder, four stroke liquid-cooled DOHC engine developed by Mahindra's Engines Engineering and Oral Engineering. The motorcycle was developed by Mahindra's Engines Engineering and Oral Engineering together. Danny Webb and Marcel Schrötter raced for the team in the first eight rounds of the Moto3 World Championship. The team scored its first Moto3 points at Le Mans on 20 May 2012, when Schrötter finished on a strong 12th position. Before the ninth round, at the Mugello Circuit, Schrötter and Team Mahindra parted ways. Riccardo Moretti, who had until then been racing for Mahindra in the CIV, stepped in for Schrötter. The first year of the new Moto3 four-stroke class proved challenging, and prompted the team into a change of direction. In August 2012, Mahindra partnered with Suter Racing Technology to develop an all-new MGP3O, their Moto3 bike for the 2013 season. And, in November of the same year, they announced that riders Efrén Vázquez and Miguel Oliveira would be racing for the team in the 2013 season.

The team achieved a double Top-10 finish in the 2013 Moto3 season opener at Qatar. This result was followed by Oliveira's 5th-place finish at the Circuit of the Americas, Team Mahindra's best performance at that point. Mahindra Racing made history in the 2013 Malaysian Grand Prix taking the first-ever podium for an Indian constructor in the MotoGP World Championship Series. In the same season, the MGP3O recorded top-five finishes in 10 of the 17 rounds, a pole position, three circuit lap records, and third position in the Constructors’ Championship.

At the end of 2013, Vázquez confirmed that he would no longer be riding with Mahindra Racing in the 2014 season, and was replaced by Arthur Sissis.

The 2014 season saw some success for Mahindra, with their MGP3O recording three podiums – including a best-ever second-place finish by their customer team, Ambrogio Racing's rider Brad Binder at the German Grand Prix. The first podium of the season was secured by Mahindra Racing rider Miguel Oliveira at the Assen circuit in the Dutch TT. For the entire season, the team riders Oliveira and Andrea Migno regularly challenged at the front of the tight Moto3 pack. The MGP3O recorded six Top-4 finishes in the entire season, as Mahindra finished third overall in the Moto3 Constructors' rankings at the end of the 2014 season.

Following the conclusion of the 2015 season, Mahindra no longer ran their own team and concentrated instead on development of the Mahindra MGP3O racing motorcycle. They switched from competing as a team, and focused on supplying bikes to customer teams. They also opened a new development centre in Besozzo, Italy.

As a manufacturer
In 2015, Mahindra Racing became a full-scale independent constructor, supporting four customer teams in the Moto3 series, including a three-bike line up from 4 times World Champion Jorge Martinez's experienced Mapfre Aspar Team. The Aspar Team's Mahindra MGP3Os were piloted by the 2014 Red Bull Rookies Champion, Spaniard Jorge Martin; Italian Francesco Bagnaia, a graduate of the VR 46 academy, who switched from the Sky VR46 team; and Juanfran Guevara, contesting his third Moto3 World Championship. Mahindra also supplied bikes for Ambrogio Racing, CIP, and San Carlo Team Italia.

In 2015, a Mahindra customer team recorded a podium finish at the French Grand Prix. 2016 got off to a strong start with Aspar Mahindra Moto3 Team rider Francesco (Pecco) Bagnaia securing a third-place podium finish at the opening round in Qatar. The Italian teen picked up podiums in Jerez (Spain) and Mugello (Italy) before making his historic first win in Assen (Netherlands) – Mahindra's maiden victory in the World Championship, and a first for a bike made by an Indian company. Two more victories followed with John Mcphee dominating the field in a wet Czech Grand Prix and Pecco taking a seven-second win in the Malaysian Grand Prix. At the Czech Grand Prix, the Indian manufacturer also scored their first-ever double podium with John Mcphee and Jorge Martin.

In 2017 Mahindra Racing competed in its last season as a constructor in the Moto3 class of MotoGP and remains the only Indian constructor in the series. Mahindra Racing supplied the Mahindra MGP3O single-cylinder, 4-stroke, 250cc motorcycle to the factory Aspar Mahindra Team and other customer teams. Mahindra continues to supply an official Peugeot Motocycles derivative of the MGP3O to the factory Peugeot MC Saxoprint Team since 2016.

Other series

CIV – Italian National Motorcycle Racing Championship

125 cc and Moto3 class
In early December 2012, Mahindra Racing announced its entry into the 125cc class of the Italian National Motorcycle Racing Championship (CIV) with Indian rider S. Sarath Kumar and Italian phenomenon Riccardo Moretti. Moretti was the 2009 champion in the 125cc class while Kumar is a former champion in the 130cc 4-stroke (Novice class, 2008) and the 165cc Expert Class (2009). Moretti won the season-opener, at the Mugello Circuit, Mahindra's first time earning a 1st-place finish. Kumar earned a third-place finish in the third round, at Monza. He left professional racing for personal reasons after round six. Moretti won the second and fourth races, at Imola and Mugello respectively. In the sixth round, at Misano, Moretti and new Mahindra rider Miroslav Popov finished first and second respectively; in the seventh round, again at Misano, Popov took first, while Moretti finished third.

In the final race of the 2012 season, Popov again took first place, and was joined on the podium by new Mahindra Racing rider Lukas Trautmann, who earned a second-place finish in his debut race. The double podium, Mahindra's third of the season, earned the team the 2012 CIV Constructor's Cup, making Mahindra the first Indian team to win an international motorsport championship.

In the 2013 season, the team entered the Moto3 class (250cc 4 stroke) in the CIV with talented riders Andrea Locatelli and Michael Rinaldi. Locatelli ended Rounds 1 and 2 with a twin podium finish: he won the first race, and finished in third place in the second. Rinaldi finished eighth in the first encounter and sixth in the second. Mahindra would go on to win the CIV Constructors’ Championship (Moto3) in 2013, and again in 2015.

Grand Prix rider Max Biaggi rode for Mahindra 2017 CIV – Italian National Championship (Moto3).

FIM CEV International Championship 
In addition to the World Championship, Mahindra Racing was a part of the FIM CEV International Championship (Moto3 Junior World Championship). They supplied MGP3O machines to Team Aspar and Team LaGlisse to compete in the World Championship feeder series.

Mahindra Racing Team Riders

FIM MotoGP (125cc and Moto3) 
  Marcel Schrötter No. 77 (2011–2012)
  Danny Webb No. 99 (2011–2012)
  Miroslav Popov No. 95 (2012)
  Riccardo Moretti No. 20 (2012)
  Miguel Oliveira No. 44 (2013-2014)
  Efrén Vázquez No. 7 (2013)
  Andrea Locatelli No. 55 (2013)
  Andrea Migno No. 16 (2014)
  Arthur Sissis No. 61 (2014 - 2019)
  Francesco Bagnaia No. 21 (2015)
  Jorge Martín No. 88 (2015)
  Juanfran Guevara No. 58 (2015)
  Stefano Manzi No. 62 (2016)
  Marco Bezzecchi No. 53 (2016)

Customer teams

FIM MotoGP (Moto3) 

Ambrogio Racing (2013-2014)
  Brad Binder No. 41 (2013-2014)
  Luca Amato No. 21 (2013)
  Jules Danilo No. 95 (2014)

CIP Team (2014-2017)
  Alessandro Tonucci No. 19 (2014)
  Bryan Schouten No. 51 (2014)
  Jasper Iwema No. 13 (2014)
  Tatsuki Suzuki No. 24 (2015-2016)
  Remy Gardner No. 2 (2015)
  Fabio Spiranelli No. 3 (2016)
  Enzo Boulom No. 99 (2016)
  Marco Bezzecchi No. 12 (2017)
  Manuel Pagliani No. 96 (2017)

Team Italia (2014-2016)
  Andrea Locatelli No. 55 (2014)
  Matteo Ferrari No. 3 (2014-2015)
  Marco Bezzecchi No. 53 (2015)
  Stefano Manzi No. 29 (2015)
  Stefano Valtulini No. 43 (2016)
  Lorenzo Petrarca No. 77 (2016)

Outox Reset Drink Team (2015)
  Alessandro Tonucci No. 19 (2015)
  Darryn Binder No. 40 (2015)

Aspar Mahindra Team Moto3 (2016-2017)
  Francesco Bagnaia No. 21 (2016)
  Jorge Martín No. 88 (2016)
  Albert Arenas No. 75 (2017)
  Lorenzo Dalla Porta No. 48 (2017)

Platinum Bay Real Estate Team (2016)
  Darryn Binder No. 40 (2016)
  Karel Hanika No. 98 (2016)
  Danny Webb No. 22 (2016)
  Marcos Ramírez No. 42 (2016)

Peugeot MC Saxoprint Team (2016-2017)
  Alexis Masbou No. 10 (2016)
  John Mcphee No. 17 (2016)
  Albert Arenas No. 12 (2016)
  Hafiq Azmi No. 38 (2016)
  Vicente Pérez No. 63 (2016)
  Jakub Kornfeil No. 84 (2017)
  Patrik Pulkkinen No. 4 (2017)

Minimoto Portomaggiore Team (2016)
  Alex Fabbri No. 71 (2016)

Motomex Team Worldwide Race (2016)
  Gabriel Martínez-Ábrego No. 18 (2016)

Mahindra MRW Aspar Team (2017)
  Raúl Fernández No. 31 (2017)

3570-MTA Team (2017)
  Edoardo Sintoni No. 30 (2017)

Racing results

Formula E results
(key)

Notes
  – In the inaugural season, all teams were supplied with a spec powertrain by McLaren.

 † – Driver did not finish the race, but was classified as they completed over 90% of the race distance.
  – Driver was fastest in group qualifying stage and was given one championship point.
 P– Marks the driver who was given three points for being starting on Pole.
 F– Marks the driver who was given one point for fastest lap.

Moto3 and 125 cc Manufacturers Championship

CIV Italian National Motorcycle Racing Championship

125cc class

Constructors' Championship

Riders' Championship

Moto3 class (2013)

Riders' Championship

Constructors' Championship

References

External links 

 The official website of Mahindra Racing

Motorcycle racing teams
Formula E teams
Indian auto racing teams
Mahindra Group
Motorcycle racing teams established in 2011
Motorcycle racing teams disestablished in 2016
2011 establishments in India